This is a List of Diplomatic Missions of Kyrgyzstan, excluding honorary consulates. The landlocked, mountainous Kyrgyz Republic has a spread of diplomatic representation across Eurasia, particularly in other former Soviet republics where bilateral and multilateral ties have survived the breakup of the Soviet Union .

America

Washington, D.C. (Embassy)
Chicago (Consulate-General)
New York City (Consular Post)

Asia

Kabul (Embassy)

 Baku (Embassy)

Beijing (Embassy)
Guangzhou (Consulate-General)
Urumqi (Visa Office)

New Delhi (Embassy)

Tehran (Embassy)
Mashad (Consular Post)

Tokyo (Embassy)

Astana (Embassy)
Almaty (Consulate-General)

Kuwait City (Embassy)

Kuala Lumpur (Embassy)

Islamabad (Embassy)
Karachi (Consulate-General)

Doha (Embassy)

Riyadh (Embassy)

Seoul (Embassy)

Dushanbe (Embassy)

Ankara (Embassy)
Istanbul (Consulate-General)

Ashkabad (Embassy)

Tashkent (Embassy)

Abu Dhabi (Embassy)
Dubai (Consulate)

Europe

Vienna (Embassy)

Minsk (Embassy)

Brussels (embassy)

Paris (Embassy)

Berlin (Embassy)
Bonn (Embassy Branch Office)
Frankfurt (Consular Agency)

 Budapest (Embassy)

Rome (Embassy)

Moscow (Embassy)
Novosibirsk (Consulate-General)
Yekaterinburg (Consulate-General)

Geneva (Consulate-General)

Kyiv (Embassy)

London (Embassy)

Multilateral organisations
 
Brussels (Delegation)
  Organization for Security and Co-operation in Europe
Vienna (Permanent Representative Office)
 
Geneva (Permanent Mission)
New York City (Permanent Mission)

Gallery

See also
 Foreign relations of Kyrgyzstan
 Visa policy of Kyrgyzstan

References

 Ministry of Foreign Affairs of the Kyrgyz Republic

 
Diplomatic missions
Kyrgyzstan